This is a list of compositions by the Italian composer Nino Rota (1911–1979).

Opera 
 Il principe porcaro (1926)
 Ariodante (1938–1941)
 Torquemada (1943)
 I due timidi (1950)
 Il cappello di paglia di Firenze (premiere 1955)
 Scuola di guida (1959)
 La notte di un nevrastenico (1959)
 Lo scoiattolo in gamba (1959)
 Aladino e la lampada magica (1963–1965)
 La visita meravigliosa (1965–1969)
 Napoli milionaria (1973–1977)

Choral 
 Allegro concertante per Coro e Orchestra (1953)
 Audi Judex per coro misto a 4 voci a cappella (1964)
 Canto di Gloria (1968)
 Custodi nos Domine per Coro
 Due Mottetti Vigilate et orate
 Il martirio di San Giovanni Battista/The Martyrdom of St. John the Baptist (1924)
 Il natale degli innocenti (1968–70)
 Il pane del cielo (1967)
 Il pastorello e altre due liriche infantile (canto e pianoforte) (1935)
 Il presagio (1925)
 Inno del seminario la quercia per coro, una voce e pianoforte
 L'infanzia di San Giovanni Battista/The childhood of St. John the Baptist (1922–23)
 L'isola disabitata (1931)
 La figliola del re (ex Un augello gorgheggiava) (1925)
 La vita di Maria (1969–1970)
 Messa a 4 voci (senza Gloria) (1962)
 Messa di Requiem (1923–1924)
 Messa per coro e organo (Orchestra) (1960)
 Messa, Mariae dicata per coro e organo (1961)
 Mysterium Catholicum (1962)
 Ninna Nanna (1922, 1923)
 Psallite nato de Maria Virgine (1958)
 Quando tu sollevi la lampada al cielo (1922)
 Roma Capomunni (1970–1971)
 Salmo IC (1943)
 Salmo VI Domine (1943)
 Salve Regina per voce e pianoforte (1958)
 Sonetto di Petrarca (1933)
 Three Canons For Women's Voices (1932)
 Tota Pulchrases (1961)
 Tu es Petrus in sol maggiore (1967)
 Unum panem (1962)

Vocal 
 Perché si spense la lampada (Quando tu sollevi la lampada al cielo) (agosto 1923)
 Vocalizzi per Soprano leggero e Pianoforte (1957)
 Tre liriche infantili per canto (soprano, tenor) e pianoforte/Three children's lyrical poems for voice and piano (1935)
 Le Prime Battute di 6 Canzoni e un Coro per "L'Isola Disabitata" (aprile 1932)
 Mater fons amoris per Soprano (o tenore) solo, coro di donne e organo (1961)
 Canto e Pianoforte (1972)
 Ballata e Sonetto di Petrarca (1933)

Orchestral 
 Infanzia di S. Giovanni Battista oratorio per soli, coro e orchestra (1922)
 Balli per piccola orchestra (1932–1934)
 Sonata (Canzona) per orchestra da camera (1935)
 Variazioni e fuga nei 12 toni sul nome di Bach per orchestra (1950)
 Concerto festivo in Fa per orchestra (1958–61)
 Concerto per archi (1964–65, nuova revisione 1977)
 Due Momenti (Divertimenti) (1970)
 Fantasia sopra dodici note del Don Giovanni (1960)
 Fuga per Quartetto d'Archi, Organo e Orchestra d'Archi (1923)
 Guardando il Fujiyama (Pensiero per Hiroshima) (1976)
 La Fiera di Bari (1963, 28-4)
 La Strada (1966)
 Le Molière imaginaire – Ballet Suite (1976–78)
 Meditazione per coro e orchestra (1954)
 Rabelaisiana (1977)
 Serenata per Orchestra in quattro tempi (1931–1932)
 Sinfonia n.1 per orchestra (1935–1939)
 Sinfonia n.2 in Fa per orchestra (1937–39)
 Sinfonia n.3 in Do (1956–1957)
 Sinfonia Sopra una Canzone d'Amore (1947) (first performance 1972)
 Sonata per orchestra da camera (1937–1938)
 Variazioni sopra un tema gioviale per orchestra (1953)
 Waltzes

Concertos for solo instrument and orchestra

Piano and orchestra 
 Cadenze per il Concerto n.4 in sol Hob.XVIII:4 di Joseph Haydn
 Concerto in C major (1960)
 Concerto soirée (1962) (a suite of six movements for piano and orchestra)
 Concerto in E minor (subtitled Piccolo mondo antico after Antonio Fogazzaro's novel) (1973, 1978)

String instrument and orchestra 
 Concerto per Violoncello n.0 (1925)
 Concerto per Arpa (1947)
 Divertimento Concertante per Contrabasso e Orchestra (1968–73)
 Concerto per Violoncello n.1 (1972)
 Concerto per Violoncello n.2 (1973)

Wind instrument and orchestra 
 Andante sostenuto per il Concerto per Corno K412 di Mozart (1959)
 Concerto per Trombone e orchestra (1966)
 Ballata per Corno e orchestra "Castel del Monte" (1974)
 Concerto per Fagotto (1974–77)

Chamber

Duets 
 Pezzo per Corno in Fa e Contrabasso (1931)
 Sonata per ottoni e organo (1972)
 Tre Pezzi per 2 flauti (1972–73)

For string instrument and piano 
 Improvviso in re minore per violino e pianoforte (1947)
 Improvviso per Violino e Pianoforte (Un diavolo sentimentale) (1969)
 Intermezzo per viola e pianoforte (1945)
 Sonata in sol per Viola e Pianoforte (1934–35, revised 1970)
 Sonata per Viola e Pianoforte della Sonata in Re per Clarinetto e pianoforte (1945)
 Sonata per violino e pianoforte (1936–37)

For wind instrument and piano 
 Castel del Monte – Ballata per Corno e Pianoforte (1974)
 Cinque Pezzi facili per flauto e pianoforte (1972)
 Elegia Per Oboe E Pianoforte (1955)
 Pezzo in re per clarinetto e pianoforte (Agosto) (1977)
 Sonata in Re per Clarinetto e Pianoforte (1945)
 Toccata per Fagotto e Pianoforte (1974)

For flute and harp 
 Cadenze per il Concerto K299 di Mozart per flauto e arpa (1962)
 Sonata per flauto e arpa (1937)

Trios 
 Trio per clarinetto, violoncello e pianoforte (1973)
 Trio per Flauto, Violino e Pianoforte (1958 settembre)

Quartets 
 Invenzioni per quartetto d'archi (1932)
 Quartetto per archi (1948–54)

Miscellaneous 
 Il Presepio: Quartetto d'archi con voce (1929)
 Il Richiamo: Quintetto d'archi con voce (1923)
 Minuetto (1931)
 Nonetto, per flauto, oboe, clarinetto, fagotto, corno, violino, viola, cello e contrabasso (1959, 1974, 1977)
 Piccola Offerta Musicale per flauto, oboe, clarinetto, corno e fagotto (1943)
 Quintetto per flauto, oboe, viola, violoncello e arpa (1935)
 Romanza (Aria) e Marcia (1968)
 Sarabanda e Toccata per Arpa (1945)
 Sonata per Organo (1965)

Piano 
 Il Mago doppio-Suite per quattro mani (1919)
 Tre pezzi (1920)
 Preludio e Fuga per Pianoforte a 4 Mani (Storia del Mago Doppio) (1922)
 Illumina Tu, O Fuoco (1924)
 Io Cesserò il Mio Canto (1924)
 Ascolta o Cuore June (1924)
 Il Presàgio (1925)
 La Figliola Del Re (Un Augello Gorgheggiava) (1925)
 Ippolito gioca (1930)
Ballo della villanotta in erba (1931)
 Campane a Festa (1931)
 Campane a Sera (1933)
 Il Pastorello e altre Due Liriche Infantili (1935)
 La Passione (poesia popolare) (1938)
 Bagatella (1941)
 Fantasia in sol (1945)
 Fantasia in do (1946)
 Azione teatrale scritta nel 1752 da Pietro Metastasio (1954)
 Variazioni e Fuga in dodici toni sul nome de Bach (1950)
 15 Preludi (1964)
 Sette Pezzi Difficili per Bambini (1971)
 Cantico in Memoria di Alfredo Casella (1972)
 Due Valzer sul nome di Bach (1975)

Film scores 

Rota composed music for more than 170 films, including The Godfather Parts I and II and Franco Zeffirelli's Romeo and Juliet.

See also 
 Nino Rota discography

References

 
Rota, Nino